Brilliant Creatures is a two-part Australian biographical documentary TV series on four notable expatriates who travelled to London in the 1960s and who, in separate fields of endeavour, won international fame there and in New York over several decades. The stories of Germaine Greer, Clive James, Barry Humphries and Bob Hughes were written and presented by Howard Jacobson. The series was produced in association with the Australian Broadcasting Corporation which first aired the series in September 2014.

See also
Australian diaspora
Australians in the United Kingdom
:Category:Australian expatriates in the United Kingdom

References

External links
 Myf Warhurst. "Australia's brilliant creatures were not like us – and surely that's the point?" The Guardian, 24 September 2014
 Helen Razer. "Kicking the expats (and Germaine kicks back) in the ABC's Brilliant Creatures", Crikey, 23 September 2014

Australian Broadcasting Corporation original programming
2010s Australian documentary television series
2014 Australian television series debuts
English-language television shows